Caulotops distanti is a species of plant bug in the family Miridae. It is found in Central America, North America, and South America.

References

Further reading

 

Articles created by Qbugbot
Insects described in 1905
Eccritotarsini